The 1973 Northwestern Wildcats team represented Northwestern University in the 1973 Big Ten Conference football season. In their first year under head coach John Pont, the Wildcats compiled a 4–7 record (4–4 against Big Ten Conference opponents) and finished in a four-way tie for fourth place in the Big Ten Conference.

The team's offensive leaders were quarterback Mitch Anderson with 1,224 passing yards, Stan Key with 894 rushing yards, and Steve Craig with 479 receiving yards. Four Northwestern players received All-Big Ten honors.  They are: (1) tight end Steve Craig (AP-1, UPI-1); (2) linebacker Mike Varty (AP-1, UPI-2); (3) quarterback Mitch Anderson (AP-2, UPI-2); and (4) running back Stan Key (AP-2).

Schedule

Personnel

References

Northwestern
Northwestern Wildcats football seasons
Northwestern Wildcats football